is a professional footballer currently playing as a defender for Barcelona.

Club career

Early career
Born in the Barcelona metropolitan area to a Japanese mother and Argentine father, Takahashi played futsal at a young age, before joining his first club FCB Peñas in La Floresta.

He joined local side San Cugat before moving to Cornellà, where he attracted the attention of Espanyol, Girona and Barcelona. He chose to sign with Barcelona, as he had supported the Catalan club since he was young, and joined in 2019.

He signed a contract extension in September 2021. A year later, in September 2022, he was named by English newspaper The Guardian as one of the best players born in 2005 worldwide.

International career
Takahashi is eligible to represent Spain, Japan and Argentina at international level. He was called up to the Japan under-16 team in 2020, but was unable to attend due to the COVID-19 pandemic. He also received a call up to the Spain under-16 team in May 2021, and has been approached by Argentina.

In May 2022, Takahashi was called up to the Japan national under-19 football team for the first time ahead of the 2022 Maurice Revello Tournament.

References

External links
 

2005 births
Living people
Footballers from Catalonia
People from Cornellà de Llobregat
Japanese footballers
Japan youth international footballers
Spanish footballers
Japanese people of Argentine descent
Spanish people of Japanese descent
Spanish people of Argentine descent
Association football defenders
UE Cornellà players
FC Barcelona players